Busher may refer to:

People
Busher (name), people with the surname
nickname of Floyd Curry (1925-2006), Canadian National Hockey League player 
nickname of Busher Jackson (1911-1966), Canadian Hall of Fame National Hockey League player

Other uses
Busher Stakes, an American Thoroughbred stakes horse race at Aqueduct Racetrack in Jamaica, New York
Busher (horse) (1942–1955), a Thoroughbred racing filly
The Busher, a 1919 drama film

See also
Bushehr Province, Iran